Bybeana schawalleri is a species of beetle in the family Cerambycidae, and the only species in the genus Bybeana. It was described by Hüdepohl in 1996.

References

Apomecynini
Beetles described in 1996
Monotypic Cerambycidae genera